Pat McDonagh may refer to:

 Pat McDonagh (businessman), founder of Supermac's, an Irish fast food franchiser
 Pat McDonagh (sportsman) (born 1957), Irish Olympic rower and bobsledder
 Pat McDonagh (fashion designer) (1934–2014), British fashion designer
 Pat McDonagh (piper) (died 1904), Irish piper

See also
 Patrick McDonagh (1906–?), Scottish footballer